Svorkmo is a village in the municipality of Orkland in Trøndelag county, Norway.

For about 100 years beginning in the 17th century, Svorkmo was an industrial centre of major importance. It was in Svorkmo that the Løkken copper mine's smelters were situated. Many people worked in the smelting works and the industry formed the base of one of Norway's largest non-city communities, with hotels, bakeries, saw mills, and the Svorkmo Station (a railway station which still exists, though now only as a museum).

Today Svorkmo is no more than a small village with few facilities (little more than a supermarket and a campsite) and the people who live there work elsewhere. Svorkmo is a classic example of the effects of the centralization on the Norwegian economy.

References

Orkland
Villages in Trøndelag